The 1954–55 season was Manchester City's 53rd season of competitive football and 38th season in the top division of English football. In addition to the First Division, the club competed in the FA Cup.

First Division

League table

Results summary

References

External links

Manchester City F.C. seasons